St. Augustine’s College is an all-male boarding academic institution in Cape Coast, Ghana. The school started at Amissano, a village near Elmina, in 1930.  The Roman Catholic institution was established to serve as a training college and seminary. The school was named after St. Augustine of Hippo (354 – 430 AD). The motto of the college is Omnia Vincit Labor, meaning "Perseverance conquers All". The school has a total of 11 houses.

History 
On 6 August 1933, the Roman Catholic Church and the Bishop of Cape Coast Vicariate Monsignor W. T. Porter felt the need to have a separate Roman Catholic school and Cape Coast was found to be the most suitable location. A commemorative foundation stone was laid in late 1935 at the present site. Fr. Maurice B. Kelly, the Dean of the Training College at Amissano which is now St. Teresa’s Seminary, Amisano,  became the first Head Dean or Headmaster.

Culture 

St. Augustine’s College, popularly known as "AUGUSCO", calls its old students "APSUnians"

Due to the historical association and their common catholic antecedents, there is a tendency for Holy Child High School, Ghana old students (HOPSA) and St. Augustine’s old students (APSUnians) to get married. The church believes marriage between old students of the two schools will perpetuate the Catholic traditions.

Student body 
The students are among the highest performing in the WAEC exams

St. Augustine's College are two time winners of the National Science and Mathematics Quiz. Winners in 2007 and 2019. In the 2007 edition of the National Science and Mathematics Quiz the college won, and two out of the school's three contestants represented Ghana. Team three won the West African Science and Mathematics Quizzes.

Participation in inter schools competitions 
The college won the finals of the 2019 edition of the Ghana National Science and Maths Quiz. This was the second time the college had emerged winners of the competition, after having won it for the first time in 2007.

In 2019, the College won its second National Science and Maths trophy, exactly twelve years after winning its maiden one. To date, the College has the record of being the only school which has won the title each time it got to the grand finale.
 
The College also won the 2016 edition of the Sprite Ball Championship .

Notable alumni

 
 
P. A. K. Aboagye, Ghanaian poet, essayist, novelist, and historian.
Paul Acquah, former governor of the Bank of Ghana.
A. K. Adu, a former diplomat
William Kwabena Aduhene, Ghanaian politician, member of parliament in the first republic
Kwaku Afriyie, Ghanaian politician 
Junior Agogo, former international soccer player
Kwesi Ahwoi, a Ghanaian politician.
Kabral Blay Amihere, a Ghanaian journalist.
Kenneth Andam, retired Ghanaian sprinter.
Samuel Kobina Annim, Government Statistician and former Associate Professor of Economics. 
Anane Antwi-Kusi, Ghanaian politician, and member of parliament in the second republic. 
Nana Asaase a literary coach and writer.
Nathaniel Attoh, a radio journalist, master of ceremonies and ring announcer. 
 Sammi Awuku, a Ghanaian politician and currently the National Organizer of the New Patriotic Party.
Kofi Baako, a politician and minister in the Nkrumah government 
Joseph Kingsley Baffour-Senkyire, Ghanaian academic, politician and diplomat; member of parliament in the first republic and formerly Ghana's ambassador to the United States of America
Joseph Kenneth Bandoh, physician; president of the West African College of Physicians (1993-1994)
John Bilson, medical doctor and politician
Ben Brako, leading Ghanaian Highlife Star; 
Albert Don-Chebe, Director General of the Ghana Broadcasting Corporation (2013-2016) 
Amu Djoleto, a Ghanaian novelist.
John Bogolo Erzuah, a former diplomat and a politician; minister in the Nkrumah government
Michael Essien, international football star; 
Kwame Gyawu-Kyem Ghanaian politician and member of parliament in the fourth republic. 
George Hagan (politician), a Ghanaian politician.
Kwame Sanaa-Poku Jantuah, a politician in the first and third republic.
Joseph Kodzo, a politician in the first republic.
Bashiru Kwaw-Swanzy, a former attorney general of the first republic.
Nana Amaniampong Marfo, member of parliament in the fourth republic.
Fred McBagonluri, engineer, inventor, novelist and academic.
Dr Paa Kwesi Nduom, former minister of Ghana, former member of parliament and entrepreneur; 
Tawia Modibo Ocran, a Ghanaian jurist; former supreme court judge of Ghana.
Jonathan Tetteh Ofei, a politician and former member of parliament during the second republic
Mark Okraku-Mantey, Ghanaian music producer and politician, Deputy Ministry of Tourism, Culture and Creative Arts.
Michael Kwasi Osei, Ghanaian politician, and member of parliament in the second republic.
Hackman Owusu-Agyeman, diplomat, former minister of state, entrepreneur and member of parliament;
Ellis Owusu-Dabo, a Ghanaian academic and Pro Vice-Chancellor of the Kwame Nkrumah University of Science and Technology.
Patrick Kwame Kusi Quaidoo, a politician and minister in the Nkrumah government
Lieutenant General Arnold Quainoo, a retired Ghanaian military officer who served as the Chief of the Defence Staff (Ghana) of the Ghana Armed Forces. 
Francis Selormey, a Ghanaian novelist.
Victor Selormey, a politician and former deputy minister of Finance and Economic Planning
Justice Emile Short, a Ghanaian judge and academic and the first Commissioner on Human Rights and Administrative Justice in Ghana.
Professor Clifford Nii Boi Tagoe, former Vice Chancellor of the University of Ghana;
Ebo Taylor, a Ghanaian guitarist, composer, arranger, bandleader, and producer.
Herbert Winful, engineering professor

References

External links
School website

Cape Coast
Catholic secondary schools in Ghana
Boarding schools in Ghana
Boys' schools in Ghana
Educational institutions established in 1930
1930 establishments in Gold Coast (British colony)
Christian schools in Ghana
High schools in Ghana
St. Augustine's College (Cape Coast) alumni